This is a list of Christian religious houses in Mecklenburg-Vorpommern in Germany, including Rügen, extant and non-extant, and including houses of both men and women. Almost all religious houses were suppressed during the Reformation in the 16th century, except for a few women's houses which survived, some into the 20th century, as Lutheran collegiate foundations for unmarried daughters of the nobility. Since the reunification of Germany in 1990, a Franciscan friary has been established, as of 2008 located at Waren.

See also
List of Christian monasteries in Brandenburg
List of Christian monasteries in North Rhine-Westphalia
List of Christian monasteries in Saxony
List of Christian monasteries in Saxony-Anhalt
List of Christian monasteries in Schleswig-Holstein

Notes

Sources
 Klosterstätten in Mecklenburg-Vorpommern 
 AufNachMV.de: Monasteries 
 Mecklenburg-VorpommernWeb.de 
 Kulturportal Mecklenburg-Vorpommern 
 Waren Friary website: Franciscans in Mecklenburg-Vorpommern 

 
Mecklenburg-Vorpommern
Mecklenburg-Western Pomerania-related lists